Malingering is the fabrication, feigning, or exaggeration of physical or psychological symptoms designed to achieve a desired outcome, such as relief from duty or work.

Malingering is not a medical diagnosis, but may be recorded as a "focus of clinical attention" or a "reason for contact with health services". Malingering is categorized as distinct from other forms of excessive illness behavior such as somatization disorder and factitious disorder, although not all mental health professionals agree with this formulation.

Failure to detect actual cases of malingering imposes an economic burden on health care systems, workers' compensation programs, and disability programs, such as Social Security Disability Insurance and veterans' disability benefits. False accusations of malingering often harm genuine patients or claimants.

History

Antiquity
According to 1 Samuel in the Old Testament, King David feigned madness to Achish, the king of the Philistines. Some scholars believe this was not feigned but real epilepsy, and phrasing in the Septuagint supports that position.

Odysseus was said to have feigned insanity to avoid participating in the Trojan War.

Malingering was recorded in Roman times by the physician Galen, who reported two cases: one patient simulated colic to avoid a public meeting, and another feigned an injured knee to avoid accompanying his master on a long journey.

Renaissance
In 1595, a treatise on feigned diseases was published in Milan by Giambattista Silvatico.

Various phases of malingering are represented in the etchings and engravings of Jacques Callot (1592–1635).

In his Elizabethan-era social-climbing manual, George Puttenham recommends a would-be courtier to have "sickness in his sleeve, thereby to shake off other importunities of greater consequence".

Modern period 
Lady Flora Hastings was accused of adultery following court gossip about her abdominal pain. She refused to be physically examined by a man for reasons of modesty and so the physician assumed she was pregnant. She later died of liver cancer.

In 1943, US Army General George S. Patton found a soldier in a field hospital with no wounds; the soldier claimed to be suffering from battle fatigue. Believing the patient was malingering, Patton flew into a rage and physically assaulted him. The patient had  malarial parasites.

Agnes Torres was the first subject of an in-depth discussion of transgender identity in sociology, published by Harold Garfinkel in 1967. In the 1950s, Torres feigned symptoms and lied about almost every aspect of her medical history. Garfinkel concluded that fearing she would be denied access to sexual reassignment surgery, she had avoided every aspect of her case which would have indicated gender dysphoria and hidden the fact that she had taken hormone therapy. Physicians observing her feminine appearance therefore concluded she had testicular feminization syndrome, which legitimized her request for the surgery.

Society and culture
Malingering is a court-martial offense in the United States military under the Uniform Code of Military Justice, which defines the term as "feign[ing] illness, physical disablement, mental lapse, or derangement."

According to the Texas Department of Insurance, fraud that includes malingering costs the US insurance industry approximately $150 billion each year. Other non-industry sources report it may be as low as $5.4 billion.

See also 

 Hypochondriasis
 Factitious disorder
 Ganser syndrome
 Insanity defense
 Münchausen syndrome
 Münchausen syndrome by proxy
 Falsifiability
 Structured Inventory of Malingered Symptomatology
 Doctor shopping

References 

 
Forensic psychology
Medical law